Morocco is a town in Beaver Township, Newton County, in the U.S. state of Indiana. The population was 1,129 at the 2010 census.

History
Morocco was laid out in 1851. The town was named either after Morocco, in North Africa or a traveler's Moroccan red boots. A post office has been in operation at the town since 1859.

The Scott-Lucas House and Seller's Standard Station and Pullman Diner are listed on the National Register of Historic Places.

Geography
Morocco is located at  (40.975650, -87.423193).

Demographics

2010 census
As of the census of 2010, there were 1,129 people, 463 households, and 299 families living in the town. The racial makeup of the town was 99.1% White, 0.1% African American, 0.1% Native American, 0.2% Asian, 0.2% from other races, and 0.4% from two or more races. Hispanic or Latino of any race were 2.2% of the population.

There were 463 households, of which 30.2% had children under the age of 18 living with them, 47.7% were married couples living together, 9.7% had a female householder with no husband present, 7.1% had a male householder with no wife present, and 35.4% were non-families. 29.8% of all households were made up of individuals, and 15.5% had someone living alone who was 65 years of age or older. The average household size was 2.44 and the average family size was 2.97.

The median age in the town was 40.5 years. 23.3% of residents were under the age of 18; 7.4% were between the ages of 18 and 24; 24.5% were from 25 to 44; 26.6% were from 45 to 64; and 18.2% were 65 years of age or older. The gender makeup of the town was 50.5% male and 49.5% female.

2000 census
As of the census of 2000, there were 1,127 people, 499 households, and 296 families living in the town. The racial makeup of the town was 98.31% White, 0.09% African American, 0.27% Native American, 0.09% Asian, 0.98% from other races, and 0.27% from two or more races. Hispanic or Latino of any race were 1.86% of the populations.

There were 469 households, out of which 27.9% had children under the age of 18 living with them, 49.7% were married couples living together, 9.6% had a female householder with no husband present, and 36.7% were non-families. 31.8% of all households were made up of individuals, and 19.0% had someone living alone who was 65 years of age or older. The average household size was 2.40 and the average family size was 3.04.

In the town, the population was spread out, with 24.3% under the age of 18, 9.8% from 18 to 24, 26.4% from 25 to 44, 22.0% from 45 to 64, and 17.5% who were 65 years of age or older. The median age was 37 years. For every 100 females, there were 94.0 males. For every 100 females age 18 and over, there were 87.5 males.

The median income for a household in the town was $32,176, and the median income for a family was $40,089. Males had a median income of $32,109 versus $20,625 for females. The per capita income for the town was $17,776. About 6.1% of families and 9.3% of the population were below the poverty line, including 6.6% of those under age 18 and 12.2% of those age 65 or over.

Education
Morocco has a public library, a branch of the Newton County Public Library.
It also has a High School, North Newton Jr-Sr High School and an Elementary school which is Morocco Elementary.

Notable person
 Sam Rice, Major League Baseball Hall of Famer

References

External links
 city-data.com

Towns in Newton County, Indiana
Towns in Indiana
Northwest Indiana